The Pune Solapur Intercity Express is an Express train belonging to Indian Railways that runs between Pune Junction and Solapur Junction. This train will not run on weekends due to doubling of track.

Coaches

The 12169/12170 Pune Solapur Intercity Express presently has 2 AC Chair Car, 8 General Second Class, 2 General Second Class coaches reserved for Pass Holders & 5 General Unreserved coaches.

Service

The 12169/12170 Pune Solapur Intercity Express was first introduced on 21 November 2009 when the 0113/14 Pune Solapur Special was converted to a regular service.

There is a well justified demand to run this as  a direct train from Mumbai to Solapur, and also extend the counterpart  Hutatma express between Pune Solapur to CSMT

References

See also
 Hutatma Express
 Indrayani Express

Transport in Pune
Rail transport in Maharashtra
Transport in Solapur
Intercity Express (Indian Railways) trains